Al Mansour  is one of the nine administrative districts in Baghdad, Iraq. It is in western Baghdad and is bounded on the east by Karkh district in central Baghdad, to the north by Kadhimiya, to the west by Baghdad International Airport, and to the south by Baghdad Airport Road, on the other side of which is Al Rashid district.

Description

Al Mansour is named after Abu Ja'far al-Mansur, the second Abbasid Caliph and founder of Baghdad.
Mansour was traditionally an affluent area where wealthy Arab families lived. It was also known as the "embassies district" due to the many foreign embassies situated there. It is known to be an avid shopping district which attracts those seeking luxury imported goods, modern market places, and services including restaurants, cafes and entertainment. However, during the sectarian unrest which occurred between 2006 and 2007, it became a place of extreme contention and violence, resulting in street violence and bombings which displaced much of the population at the time resulting in extensive damage and a depopulation of citizens due to the Sunni majority at the time leaving the district. Gradually, as the situation in Baghdad stabilized, markets, shopping malls, and luxury goods returned to the area.

Al-Mansour statue
A bronze bust of Abu Ja'far al-Mansur was erected in the Mansour district in 1976 and was designed to serve as a link between Iraq's illustrious past and its bright future. The work of Iraqi sculptor, Khaled al-Rahal, the bust was irreparably damaged by bomb blast in 2003 and was dismantled in 2005.

Neighborhoods
 62.Qadissiya
 63.Mansour neighbourhood, Dragh, Baghdad International Fair
 64.Al-Washash
 65.Iskan
 66.14 Ramadan
 67.Yarmouk
 68.Safarat complex, Kafa'at
 69.Al-A'amiriya
 70.Al Khadhraa, Hayy Al-Jami'a
 71.Al-Adel
 72.Ghazaliya East
 73.Ghazaliya west
 74.Baghdad Airport-Abu Ghrib road

See also
 List of places in Iraq
 List of neighborhoods and districts in Baghdad
 Mansour neighbourhood

References

 United Nations humanitarian info.org map listing 89 neighborhoods

External links
Mansour district in Baghdad, Christmas 2016 (VIDEO)

Administrative districts in Baghdad